KICX-FM (96.1 MHz) is a radio station broadcasting an adult contemporary music format. Licensed to McCook, Nebraska, United States, the station is currently owned by Armada Media.

References

External links

ICX-FM
Mainstream adult contemporary radio stations in the United States
Radio stations established in 1974
1974 establishments in Nebraska